Callum Dunphy is a Canadian actor originally from Nova Scotia. He is most noted for his recurring role as Finn in the television series Sex & Violence, for which he was a Canadian Screen Award nominee for Best Supporting Actor in a Dramatic Series at the 4th Canadian Screen Awards in 2016.

He has also appeared in the television series Forgive Me and Cam Boy, the web series I Am Syd Stone, and the films Splinters and Stage Mother. He received a nomination for Best Actor from the Nova Scotia chapter of the ACTRA Awards in 2019 for Splinters.

References

External links

21st-century Canadian male actors
Canadian male film actors
Canadian male television actors
Canadian male web series actors
Male actors from Nova Scotia
Living people
Year of birth missing (living people)